Liu Xucang (1913–1966) was a photographer, born in Nanxun, Huzhou, Zhejiang. Liu pioneered in the use of color film, photography of everyday objects, and nudes. He was twice elected secretary of the Chinese Photographers Association 中国摄影家协会. He died in 1966, at the beginning of the Cultural Revolution, presumably as a result of political harassment.

Career as a photographer

Liu Xucang was born into an affluent provincial family, and learned German and English in his early years. From his teens, he pursued photography, picking up darkroom techniques from observing a nearby photography studio. He moved to Shanghai with his family, reading books and magazines about photography, attending photographic exhibitions, and became acquainted with the Shanghai photographer Lang Jingshan. He did not study photography formally. In 1932, he collaborated with a friend to found the Art Life magazine, with himself as editor, to promote photographic art. He studied with Zhang Chongren to learn drawing, water color, and oil painting. After 1945 he worked in commercial photography and the film industry. In 1956 the Photographic Society of China was established and Liu he was elected executive director. Starting in the 1930s, his work was exhibited in Europe and North America.

Notes

External links
 Liu Xucang Memorial, Nanxun.
 The Liu Xucang 刘旭沧 Exhibition Hall

Chinese photographers
Chinese photojournalists
1913 births
1966 deaths
People from Huzhou
Artists from Shanghai
Victims of the Cultural Revolution
Date of birth missing
Date of death missing
Place of birth missing
Place of death missing